The Dalhousie District was a historic district in Upper Canada which existed until 1849. It was created in 1838 from Carleton County in the Bathurst District. Townships from the Johnstown and Ottawa districts were added to Carleton County at the same time.

The district town was Bytown, later Ottawa.

In 1849, the district was replaced by Carleton County.

References 
Armstrong, Frederick H. Handbook of Upper Canadian Chronology. Toronto : Dundurn Press, 1985. 

 

Districts of Upper Canada
1838 establishments in Upper Canada